William Frederick Evans was an English entomologist who worked on Odonata and Orthoptera. Evans wrote British Libellulinae or Dragonflies (1845) which has 12 coloured plates. This seems to be a rare work of entomology. He also described a species of grasshopper from New South Wales. Very little is known about Evans. He gave his address in 1857 as 'Admiralty' and was a sailor in the Royal Navy. In 1848 he was Secretary of the Entomological Society of London. Between 1845 and 1847 he gave four gifts of Coleoptera to the British Museum (Natural History) (1845.132; 1846.113; 1847.45; 1847.85). Other insects were given at different times from various countries including North Africa and in 1870 and 1875 he sold a collection of British and foreign insects, and his library through James Francis Stephens.

Taxa described by Evans include:
 Brachytron (1845)
 Ephippithyta maculata (1847)

References

English entomologists
Year of birth missing
Year of death missing